Richard S. Potember is an American scientist and inventor. He is currently a principal systems engineer at MITRE. Prior to this he was a program manager in the Tactical Technology Office at the Defense Advanced Research Projects Agency (DARPA). He has been an instructor at the Whiting School of Engineering at the Johns Hopkins University since 1987. He was a member of the principal professional staff at the Johns Hopkins Applied Physics Laboratory, Laurel, Maryland, from 1981 to 2015. He served as an adjunct professor at The Paul H. Nitze School of Advanced International Studies  from 1995 to 1998. He is best known for his pioneering work in developing electrical and optical materials and devices, as well as for his biomedical and biodefense research.

Education 
Potember was born in Boston, Massachusetts. He completed his B.S. in chemistry from Merrimack College in 1975 and his Ph.D. from Johns Hopkins University in chemistry in 1979, where his adviser was Dwaine O. Cowan. He completed his postdoctoral fellowship at the Johns Hopkins Applied Physics Laboratory (APL) in 1980. He received an M.S. in technical management from the Whiting School of Engineering, Johns Hopkins University in 1986.

Research
Potember was first known for his groundbreaking work in molecular electronics. He invented the first two-terminal molecular non-volatile memory or memristor as well as an optical disc technology that can store multiple bits of information at one location.  He also co-invented a sol-gel processed switchable vanadium(IV) oxide thin film coating for energy conservation applications.

Potember's recent achievements have focused on biotechnology  and biomedical engineering. He performed pioneering work that demonstrated individual living nerve cells can be grown into controlled geometric patterns on substrates and these neurons can form true synaptic connections. He also invented a pathogen neutralization technology that can be used to destroy viruses, bacteria and spores real-time in ventilated air, and in heating or air conditioning systems.

Potember has also conducted research and development in the areas of time-of-flight mass spectrometry and solid propellants.

Commercial activities
Potember holds fourteen U.S. patents. His inventions have been licensed to industry five times.

Personal life
Potember has two sons and lives with his wife in Maryland.

Awards and achievements
His inventions in the field of biodefense were the basis for the formation of the Biodefense Research Group Inc., (BDRGI). Potember was the recipient of the APL Master Inventor Award in 2007 and the APL Inventor of the Year Award in 2004. He received a commendation from the United States Air Force, Wright-Patterson Air Force Base in 1989 for his work on optical switching materials.

Community involvement
Potember served as a trustee at Goucher College for a full ten-year term (1996–2005). He served on Howard County, Maryland Economic Development Authority Center for Business and Technology. He delivered hands-on science and engineering lectures to students in the Howard County, Maryland, school system. He served as a youth sailing instructor at the Potapskut Sailing Association, Pasadena, Maryland.

References

Year of birth missing (living people)
Living people
People from Boston
Whiting School of Engineering alumni
Molecular electronics
20th-century American inventors
21st-century American businesspeople
Mitre Corporation people
Johns Hopkins University faculty
Merrimack College alumni
Biotechnologists
American biomedical engineers